Song Up in Her Head is the first studio album by American folk and bluegrass singer-songwriter Sarah Jarosz, released on June 19, 2009 on Sugar Hill Records. It was recorded and mixed at Minutia Studios and The Mastering Lab, respectively, in Nashville, TN, by Gary Paczosa with additional engineering by Brandon Bell, John Netti, Keith Gary, Mike Judeh and Chris Dye. The song "Mansinneedof" was nominated for Best Country Instrumental Performance at the 52nd Annual Grammy Awards.

Track listing

Personnel 
 Sarah Jarosz – lead vocals (all tracks except 4 and 7), octave mandolin (track 1), mandolin (tracks 4 and 12) guitar (tracks 2, 6 and 13), Clawhammer banjo (tracks 3, 5, 7, 8, 10)
 Paul Kowert – bass (tracks 1, 4 and 11)
 Darrell Scott – harmony vocals (tracks 1, 6), National Resonator guitar (track 6)
 Chris Thile – mandolin (tracks 1, 11 and 13), harmony vocals (track 13)
 Kenny Malone – percussion (tracks 1, 6 and 12)
 Jerry Douglas – Weissenborn slide guitar (track 3), Dobro Resonator guitar (tracks 7 and 8)
 Stuart Duncan – fretless banjo (track 2), fiddle (tracks 6, 8 and 10), Waldzither zither (track 2)
 Ben Sollee – cello (tracks 2, 5 and 9)
 Tim Lauer – piano, synthesizer (track 2)
 Mark Schatz – bass (tracks 3, 5, 6 and 10)
 Alex Hargreaves – fiddle (tracks 3, 4, 5, 7 and 12)
 Tim O'Brien – harmony vocals (tracks 3 and 12)
 Mike Marshall – second mandolin (track 4), mandoloncello (track 9), mandolin (track 5)
 Byron House – bass (track 8)
 Chris Eldridge – guitar (track 8)
 Aoife O'Donovan – harmony vocals (track 8)
 Sarah Siskind – harmony vocals (tracks 8 and 11)
 Luke Reynolds – steel guitar (9 and 11), electric octave mandolin (track 11)
 Samson Grisman – bass (tracks 7 and 12)

References 

2009 debut albums
Sarah Jarosz albums
Sugar Hill Records albums